The Slovak Embassy in Washington, D.C. is the main diplomatic mission of Slovak Republic to the United States.

It is located at 3523 International Court NW in Washington, D.C.

The Ambassador is Radovan Javorčík.

References

External links

Official website
wikimapia

Slovakia
Washington, D.C.
Slovakia–United States relations
North Cleveland Park